Southern Lakes may refer to:

Southern Lakes (New Zealand)
Southern Lakes (electoral district), a former electoral district in Canada
Mount Lorne-Southern Lakes, a current electoral district in Canada

See also
South Lake (disambiguation)